Kerry Walk is the president of Marymount Manhattan College, a private liberal arts university located on the Upper East Side of Manhattan. Prior to assuming the role in July 2015, Walk served as interim President of Otis College of Art and Design in Los Angeles, where she was appointed provost in 2011. Walk has also held positions at Harvard University, Princeton University, and Pitzer College.

References

Year of birth missing (living people)
Living people
Heads of universities and colleges in the United States
Marymount Manhattan College
Wellesley College alumni
University of California, Berkeley alumni